Community Medical Center may refer to:
 Community Medical Center (Montana)
 Adventist Health Handford, formerly Hanford Community Medical  Center
 Community Medical Center (New Jersey) in Toms River
 Community Medical Center Long Beach
 Community Medical Center (Nebraska) in Falls City
 Cordova Community Medical Center in Cordova, Alaska
 Putnam Community Medical  Center in Putnam, Florida

See also
Community Regional Medical Center
Community hospital